Arancay District is one of eleven districts of the province Huamalíes in Peru.

See also 
 Kinwaqucha

References